Cholly Knickerbocker is a pseudonym used by a series of society columnists writing for papers including the New York American and its successor, the New York Journal-American.

The name came from the perceived New York upper-crust pronunciation of "Charlie", and the pseudonym of Washington Irving "Diedrich Knickerbocker".

Users of Cholly Knickerbocker
 John W. Keller, New York Recorder, 1891–1896
 Keller, New York American, 1896–?
 Several others, New York American, ?–1919
 Maury Henry Biddle Paul, 1919–1942
 New York American, 1919–1937
 New York Journal-American, 1937–1942
 Igor Cassini (with Liz Smith), New York Journal-American, c. 1945–1963
 Charles A. Van Rensselaer, New York Journal-American, 1963–1965

 "Cholly Knickerbocker" is also referenced in the Paramount Pictures film Sabrina (1954) and the song "High Society" the opening song of the 1956 Movie of the same name Feat. Louis Armstrong.

Users of Suzy Knickerbocker
 Aileen Mehle, New York Journal-American, 1963-1966

References

Pseudonyms